Fiskernes Chapel is a chapel of the Church of Norway in Træna Municipality in Nordland county, Norway. It is located on the island/village of Selvær. It is an annex chapel in the Træna parish which is part of the Nord-Helgeland prosti (deanery) in the Diocese of Sør-Hålogaland. The white, wooden chapel was built in a long church style in 1887 using plans drawn up by the architect A. B. Jurgensen. The chapel seats about 30 people.

See also
List of churches in Sør-Hålogaland

References

Træna
Churches in Nordland
Wooden churches in Norway
19th-century Church of Norway church buildings
Churches completed in 1887
1887 establishments in Norway
Long churches in Norway